The 1963 Australia Cup was the second season of the Australia Cup, which was the main national association football knockout cup competition in Australia. 24 clubs from around Australia qualified to enter the competition.

Teams

Round 1

Round 2

Quarter-finals

Semi-finals

Third place playoff

Final

Replay

References

Australia Cup
1963 in Australian soccer
Australia Cup (1962–1968) seasons